Barklieside is a town in Umzinyathi District Municipality in the KwaZulu-Natal province of South Africa.

References

Populated places in the Nqutu Local Municipality